Immature (later known as IMx) is an American R&B boy band, managed by record producer Chris Stokes. Its members include Marques "Batman" Houston (born August 4, 1981), Jerome "Romeo" Jones (born October 25, 1981), and Kelton "LDB" Kessee (born January 2, 1981), all natives of Los Angeles, California, where the group was formed. The group released four albums under the Immature moniker: On Our Worst Behavior (1992; the only album to include original member Don "Half Pint" Santos, later replaced by Kessee), Playtyme Is Over (1994), We Got It (1995) and The Journey (1997).

In 1999, the group changed its name to IMx, marking ten years of being a group and released two studio albums Introducing IMx and IMx, as well as a Greatest Hits album in 2001. The group also branched out into film (such as House Party 3 and House Party 4: Down to the Last Minute) and television (such as A Different World, Sister, Sister, Family Matters, Soul Train and All That) before disbanding in 2002. In 2010, Houston announced on 106 & Park that the group were planning to record another group album together for 2011. A new album is currently in the works titled "Forever Immature". It was scheduled to be released in Summer 2013, along with a tour, however, a release has yet to be given for the project. On November 6, 2013, Immature performed their first show since reuniting at Club Nokia in Los Angeles with Next and Dru Hill. In September 2019, Immature announced their #TBTour with special guests Ray J, B5 and J. Holiday.

Biography
Immature was formed in Los Angeles, California in 1990 by Marques "Batman" Houston, Jerome "Romeo" Jones and Don "Half-Pint" Santos. Kelton "LDB" Kessee (the group's drummer) joined the group full-time in 1994, replacing Santos due to his parents pulling him from the group after they starred together in House Party 3. In 1999, the group would change their name to IMx, feeling Immature no longer reflected the band.

After IMx
In 2002, the group disbanded. Houston and Jones (under the name Young Rome) began pursuing solo careers, while Kessee continued his work as a record producer. Houston became the first former member to release a solo album, MH, in 2003. Jones followed suit with the release of his debut solo album, titled Food for Thought, in 2004. Houston later released five additional albums:  Naked (2005), Veteran (2007), Mr. Houston (2009), Mattress Music (2010) and Famous (2013).

Houston and Jones have also pursued acting careers, with both starring in the dance film, You Got Served (2004). Houston co-starred in Fat Albert (2004) and landed a lead role in UPN's comedy sitcom Cuts. In 2007, he starred in the horror film Somebody Help Me. He also appeared as Roger on the show Sister, Sister (1994–1998).

Music career

Immature

On Our Worst Behavior

In 1992, Immature released their debut album, On Our Worst Behavior, on September 22. The album featured singles "Da Munchies", "I Wanna Know U That Way" and "Tear It Up (On Our Worst Behavior)" which also appeared on the soundtrack for the animated film Bébé's Kids, in which Houston provided his voice for the character Khalil.

Although the album failed to make it onto any of Billboard's charts, their song "Tear It Up (On Our Worst Behavior)" managed to make it onto Billboards Hot R&B/Hip-Hop Songs, peaking at number 29.

Playtyme Is Over

Immature released their second album, Playtyme Is Over, on August 2, 1994, after signing a deal with MCA Records. The album featured singles "Never Lie" (their biggest hit), "Constantly" and "I Don't Mind".

In the United States, Playtyme Is Over peaked at number 88 on the Billboard 200 and peaked at number 26 on Billboards Top R&B/Hip-Hop Albums.

We Got It

In 1995, Immature released their third album, We Got It. The album featured singles "We Got It", "Lover's Groove" and "Please Don't Go".

In the United States, We Got It peaked at number 76 on the Billboard 200 and peaked at number 14 on Billboards Top R&B/Hip-Hop Albums.

The Journey

In 1997, Immature released their fourth album, The Journey, which was their last under the name Immature. The album featured singles "I'm Not a Fool", "Give Up The Ghost" (featuring Bizzy Bone) and "Extra, Extra" (written by and featuring Keith Sweat).

In the United States, The Journey peaked at number 92 on the Billboard 200 and peaked at number 20 on Billboards Top R&B/Hip-Hop Albums.

The track "Tamika" appeared on the sitcom Sister, Sister episode "A Friend in Deed", which first aired on October 29, 1997. In this episode, the group performed as themselves at the school fundraiser.

Introducing IMx

In 1999, Immature changed their name to IMx and released their fifth album, Introducing IMx. The album featured singles "Stay the Night", "Keep It On the Low" and "In & Out of Love". It was the group's last album with MCA Records.

In the United States, Introducing IMx peaked at number 101 on the Billboard 200 and peaked at number 31 on Billboards Top R&B/Hip-Hop Albums.

IMx

On August 21, 2001, IMx released their sixth album, IMx, after signing a deal with TUG Entertainment and New Line Records (now WaterTower Music). The album featured singles "First Time", "Beautiful (You Are)", "Clap Your Hands Pt. 1" and "Ain't No Need" (which also appeared on the soundtrack for the film The Adventures of Pluto Nash).

In the United States, IMx peaked at number 126 on the Billboard 200, being their lowest charting Billboard spot. and peaked at number 26 on Billboards Top R&B/Hip-Hop Albums.

Remember 

In early 2015, the band reunited to release a comeback EP  album titled, "Remember" and changed their name back to their original band name, "Immature". The album features mature-sounding remakes of their classic hits "Never Lie" and "Please Don't Go" along with six newly released songs such as "Let Me Find Out", "Oh My" and "Best Sex". While the EP, which was released exclusively on Complex.com and BET.com, is just an "appetizer" for fans, the band has expressed they are working on their seventh studio album titled "Forever". The band also mentioned they are in the works of producing a biopic chronicling their career over the years, with the hopes of it being produced through VH1 or Lifetime.

Other works
On February 27, 2001, IMx released their Greatest Hits album which featured all of the popular singles that Immature/IMx had released in the past nine years. It also included several remixes of the original versions and songs that they had made guest appearances on (such as R&B singer Monteco's song "Is It Me?").

The group's song "Keep it on the Low" was used as the theme song for the film House Party 4: Down to the Last Minute which they also are the stars of.

Immature collaborated with comedy actor Kel Mitchell on the hit song "Watch Me Do My Thing", which was featured on the soundtrack of the Nickelodeon sketch comedy, All That.

Members

Current lineup
Marques "Batman" Houston – lead vocals (1990–present)
Kelton "LDB" Kessee – background vocals (1993–present)
Jerome "Romeo" Jones – main rapper, background vocals (1990–present)

Former members

Don "Half Pint" Santos – background vocals, rapper (1990-1993)

Discography

On Our Worst Behavior (1992)
Playtyme Is Over (1994)
We Got It (1995)
The Journey (1997)
Introducing IMx (1999)
IMx (2001)
Remember EP (2015)

References

American contemporary R&B musical groups
African-American musical groups
American boy bands
MCA Records artists